Khaled Jamal Al-Brijawi (born 8 July 1990), commonly known as Khaled Al-Brijawi, is a Syrian footballer who plays for Fanja in Oman Professional League.

Club career

Khaled began his professional career in 2008 with Al-Majd SC Damascus.

After spending a five-seasons spell with Al-Majd SC in Syria, on 12 September 2013 he signed a one-year contract with Oman Professional League club Al-Seeb Club. On 17 August 2014, he signed a one-year contract extension with Al-Seeb Club.

Club career statistics

International career
From 2006 to 2008, he played for the Syria national under-17 football team and the Syria national under-20 football team. He was part of the squad that participated in the FIFA U-17 World Cup 2007 in South Korea. He played in two matches in the tournament, one in a 2–0 win over Honduras and another in the Round of 16 in a 3–1 loss against England. He was also member of the squad that participated in the 2008 AFC U-19 Championship.

He has made two appearances for the Syria national football team in the 2012 Nehru Cup.

Honours

Club
With Al-Majd
Syrian Cup (0): Runner-up 2009
Syrian Super Cup (0): Runners-up 2009
With Al-Seeb
Oman Professional League Cup (0): Runner-up 2013

National Team
FIFA U-17 World Cup 2007: Round of 16

References

External links

Khaled Al-Brijawi at Goal.com

1990 births
Living people
Sportspeople from Damascus
Syrian footballers
Syria international footballers
Syrian expatriate footballers
Association football defenders
Al-Seeb Club players
Oman Professional League players
Expatriate footballers in Oman
Syrian expatriate sportspeople in Oman
Syrian Premier League players